Dr. Tolon is a farmer, physician and demographer. He was born on 22 July 1950 in Istanbul. He is the second son of Dr. Nurullah Ihsan Tolon and Mihrizafer Tolon (Kostem).
He attended Ankara Koleji 1955-1964 and Nicolaus Cusanus Gymnasium in Bad Godesberg, Bonn 1964-1968. During his medical studies at the University of Kiel and University of Bonn he participated in "externships" at the University of Sydney and Royal Flying Doctor Service of Australia and Utah, USA with German Academic Exchange Service scholarships. He earned his doctorate (Dr. med.) with a dissertation on UV irradiation of airborne bacteria at the University of Bonn in Germany under the supervision of doctorate advisor Prof. Dr. Edgar Thofern. In Kiel Prof. Fritz Baade :de:Fritz Baade was his mentor. He was also influenced by and later became the physician of Celal Bayar and Samed Ağaoğlu,  both imprisoned with his father after the 1960 Turkish coup d'état. He worked with Prof. Bohle on Nephropathology in Tübingen and received his degrees in Internal Medicine and Nephrology while at the Lübeck medical faculty.

He is the founder of Biosan outpatient clinic in 1986, a Turco-Germanic joint venture pioneering in extracorporeal kidney stone treatment, ESWL, in Istanbul and Izmir, Turkey. He remained active on the board of Biosan until 2000.

In 1990 Dr. Tolon was the first Turkish doctor to receive an invitation from the Chinese Academy of Sciences in Beijing because of his work on ESWL. In the 1990s he also worked on erosion with Prof. Agadjan Babayev  in  the Turkmenian Academy of Sciences in Ashgabad.

He has been actively farming since 1992 in Manisa, Akhisar in the Aegean region of Turkey (olives, almonds). Mahmut Tolon currently lives in Urla (District), İzmir, near the ancient site of Limantepe-Klazomenai, teaches a post-graduate course on longevity and co-existence of cultures at Dokuz Eylül University, Izmir and lectures about evolution/Charles Darwin.

His works include:
- 2007 "Bias is Beautiful, or Swan Song for Common Sense" a compelling solution to help cultures come together and find answers to difficult global problems. Where he proposes a parental license and the right of one child for each human.
- 2004 Scientific work on fasting among others with Prof. Herman Chernoff.
- 1993 Poems von einem Gastarbeiter under the pseudonym B.N. Deniz, Germany
-	1993 Keçi ve Zina (Goat and adultery- Essays), Turkey 
-	1975 the publication of Dr. Paul Ehrlich's bestseller The Population Bomb in Turkish.
-	  Various columns in Milliyet and Cumhuriyet 
- Various international scientific articles, specifically about UV irradiation and extra-corporeal kidney and gallstone treatments.

External links
 For the online version of Keci ve Zina (Goat and Adultery - Essays) 
 For the online version of Poems von einem Gastarbeiter 
 For a complete list of scientific publications please go to 
 Yarimada.org articles can be found at 
 Akhisar Haber Ajansi articles can be found at 
 For a summary on the article discussing fasting and traffic accidents go to 

1950 births
Turkish nephrologists
Turkish writers
Living people